The Guerry et Bourguignon was a French automobile built only in 1907 by a cycle company from Paris.  It was described as a "tri-voiturette".

References

Defunct motor vehicle manufacturers of France
Manufacturing companies based in Paris